The Billboard Music Award for Top Rap Song winners and nominees. This award has been given to "Fancy", "The Phuncky Feel One", "Hot in Herre", "See You Again", "I'll Be Missing You", and "Love the Way You Lie".

Winners and nominees

Superlatives

The following individuals received two or more Top Rap Song Awards:

The following individuals received two or more Top Rap Song nominations:

References

Billboard awards